Robert Défossé (19 June 1909 – 30 August 1973) was a French footballer who played as a goalkeeper.

References

External links
 
 
 

1909 births
1973 deaths
Association football goalkeepers
French footballers
France international footballers
Ligue 1 players
Red Star F.C. players
1934 FIFA World Cup players
Olympique Lillois players